One of the prime systems of plant taxonomy, the Engler system was devised by Adolf Engler (1844–1930), and is featured in two major taxonomic texts he authored or co-authored. His influence is reflected in the use of the terms "Engler School" and "Engler Era". Engler's starting point was that of Eichler who had been the first to use phylogenetic principles, although Engler himself did not think that he was.

Engler's works 
His modified Eichler schema first appeared in 1886 in his Guide to Breslau Botanic Garden (of which he was the director) and was expanded in his Syllabus der Pflanzenfamilien in 1892. This reflected the new post-Darwinian perspective. Engler's Syllabus first appeared in 1892 with the title Syllabus der Vorlesungen über specielle und medicinisch-pharmaceutische Botanik. Many subsequent editions have appeared since, and it was continued after Engler's death in 1930. The most recent edition was the 13th in 2009.

The other major work was Die Natürlichen Pflanzenfamilien (1887-1915) written with Karl Anton Prantl in 23 volumes. An incomplete second edition was issued in 28 parts (1924-1980). Die Natürlichen Pflanzenfamilien consisted of a complete revision of plant families down to generic level and often even further. Die Natürlichen Pflanzenfamilien is still considered one of the few true World Floras. Finally there was the also incomplete Das Pflanzenreich (1900–1968), a multi-authored work which attempted to provide a modern version of Linnaeus' Species Plantarum (1753). The Engler system rapidly became the most widely used system in the world.

References to the Engler system may imply an edition of the Syllabus der Pflanzenfamilien or Die Natürlichen Pflanzenfamilien. The different approaches between the two works and the different editions has resulted in inconsistencies in the descriptions of the system. A number of references to the Engler system actually refer to later revisions ('modified Engler system') undertaken by Melchior and colleagues, the 12th edition of the Syllabus (1964). Many of the world's herbaria have been organised on the Engler system, particularly in North America and in Europe other than Britain. The Engler system is also reflected in his multi-volume collaborative work, begun in 1900, Das Pflanzenreich: regni vegetablilis conspectus. 

Plants were considered to form a number of divisions (Abteilung), the number of which continually changed but initially (1886) was four and in 1919 was thirteen. Many of these referred to lower life forms such as bacteria and algae that would not necessarily be considered as plants today. Initially higher plants (Embryophyta or terrestrial plants) were considered in two divisions, Embryophyta Asiphonogama (bryophytes, pteridophytes) and Embryophyta Siphonogama (Spermatophytes: gymnosperms, angiosperms), but were later subdivided. Embryophyta Siphonogama replaced the older term Phanerogamae, and the classes were further divided into groups of families, called orders. Engler followed Eichler's phylogeny, placing the monocotyledons before the dicotyledons, and within the latter the Archichlamydeae before the Metachlamydeae. While the groupings were largely based on those of Bentham and Hooker, the ordering was very much based on the concept of the primitive plant and those that were derived from these.

Führer durch den Königlich botanischen Garten  (Engler 1886) 

Synopsis

 Division Mycetozoa (Myxomycetes)
 Division Thallophyta
 Subdivision Schizophyta
 Subdivision Algae
 Class Bacilleriaceae (Diatomaceae)
 Class Chlorophyceae
 Class Phaeophyceae
 Class Rhodophyceae (Florideae)
 Subdivision Fungi
 Class Phycomycetes
 Class Ustilagineae
 Class Ascomycetes (Lichenes)
 Subdivision Characeae
 Division Zoidogamae (Archegoniatae)
 Subdivision Bryophyta
 Class Hepaticae
 Class Musci frondosi
 Subdivision Pteridophyta
 Class Filicinae (2 orders) p. 11
 Class Equisetinae
 Class Lycopodinae
 Division Siphonogamae (Phanerogamae, Anthophyta) 
 Subdivision Gymnospermae (Archispermae)
 Class Cycadinae
 Class Coniferae
 Class Gnetales
 Subdivision Angiospermae (Metaspermae)
 Class Monocotyledoneae (10 orders) p. 18
 Class Dicotyledoneae
 Subclass Archichlamydeae (Choripetalae, Apetalae) (25 orders) p. 30
 Subclass Sympetalae (10 orders) p. 57

Division Zoidogamae (Archegoniatae) 
 Subdivision Bryophyta
 Class Hepaticae
 Class Musci frondosi
 Subdivision Pteridophyta
 Class Filicinae (2 orders)
 Order Filices p. 11
 Order Hydropterides p. 13
 Class Equisetinae
 Class Lycopodinae

Division Siphonogamae (Phanerogamae, Anthophyta)

Subdivision Gymnospermae (Archispermae) 
 Class Cycadinae
 Class Coniferae
 Class Gnetales

Subdivision Angiospermae (Metaspermae) 
 Class Monocotyledoneae (10 orders) p. 18

Class Monocotyledoneae 
 Order Pandanales (3 families) p. 18
 Order Helobiae (Fluviales) (9 families) p. 18
 Order Glumiflorae (2 families) p. 18
 Family Gramineae
 Family Cyperaceae  p. 21
 Order Principes (1 family) p. 21
 Order Synanthae (1 family) p. 22
 Order Spathiflorae (2 families) p. 22
 Order Farinosae (11 families) p. 23
 Order Liliiflorae (Solido-albuminatae) (8 families) p. 23
 Family Juncaceae p. 23
 Family Liliaceae (10 subfamilies) p. 23
 Subfamily Melanthioideae p. 24
 Subfamily Herrerioideae
 Subfamily Asphodeloideae
 Subfamily Allioideae p. 25
 Subfamily Liliodeae p. 25
 Subfamily Dracaenoideae
 Subfamily Asparagoideae p. 26
 Subfamily Ophiopogonoideae
 Subfamily Luzuriagoideae
 Subfamily Smilacoideae p. 26
 Family Haemodoraceae
 Family Amaryllidaceae (3 subfalies) p. 26
 Subfamily Amaryllidoideae p. 26
 Subfamily Agavoideae p. 26
 Subfamily Hypoxidoideae 
 Family Velloziaceae p. 27
 Family Taccaceae
 Family Dioscoreaceae
 Family Iridaceae (3 subfamilies) p. 27
 Subfamily Crocoideae
 Subfamily Iridoideae
 Subfamily Ixioideae
 Order Scitamineae p. 28
 Order Microspermae

Class Dicotyledoneae 
 Subclass Archichlamydeae (Choripetalae, Apetalae) (25 orders) p. 30
 Subclass Sympetalae (10 orders) p. 57

Die Natürlichen Pflanzenfamilien (Engler and Prantl 1887–1915)

Synopsis of first edition 

 Myxothallophyta (Myxomycetes) [I (1)] 1897
 Euthallophyta
 Embryophyta Zoidiogama (Archegoniatae) (later Embryophyta Asiphonogama) [I (3)] 1909
 Embryophyta Siphonogama [II (1)] 1889

Syllabus der Pflanzenfamilien (Engler ed. 1892–)

Synopsis of first edition 

 Myxothallophyta
 Euthallophyta
 Embryophyta Zoidiogama (Archegoniatae)
 Embryophyta Siphonogama (Phanerogamae)
 Gymnospermae
 Angiospermae

Das Pflanzerreich (Engler ed. 1900–)

In the foreword included in the first part of this monumental work, Engler explained the need for a more detailed monograph than in Pflanzenfamilien.

Notes

References

Bibliography

Works by Engler 

 
  
 
  Google Books

Works about Engler

External links 
 Engler & Prantl system
 Bhandary, J. Engler & Prantl system of classification. 2013 Slide show
  George H. M. Lawrence  TAXONOMY OF VASCULAR PLANTS: Part One 03. History of Classification: Theories

system, Engler
Systems of bacterial taxonomy
Systems of fungus taxonomy
Systems of algal taxonomy